Raoul Martinez (1876–1974) was a French artist.

Life
The French painter Martinez was born from well to do parents who lived in Paris. The family owned a hacienda near Havana. After his education in Paris Martinez worked for some years at the estate. He had a Cuban background and he had Cuban connections for many years. After his stay there he returned to Europe, first to Brussels where he lived from 1896 till circa 1915. In Brussels he started his career as a painter in 1907 and had his first exhibition at La Libre Esthétique in 1910. During the First World War and thereafter he worked a couple of periods in the Netherlands and in Belgium, after the Second World War he settled in Paris.

Exhibitions
The Netherlands
 La Libre Esthétique (Brussels), 1910, 1911
 De Branding (Rotterdam and Utrecht), 1918, (Rotterdam) 1919 
 Vereniging Voor de Kunst (Utrecht), 1918, 1921, 1923, 1927, 1934 
 Exhibitions at many other Dutch art associations and Dutch art galleries (in Amsterdam and The Hague) 1921 and thereafter
 Solo exhibition in the Haags Gemeentemuseum (The Hague), 1956
 Solo exhibition in museum De Wieger (Deurne), 1999

Belgium
 Galerie San Salvador (Brugge), 1926

France
 Galerie Imberti (Bordeaux), 1938

Switzerland
 Galerie Max Rohr (Bern), 1951

Museum collections
The Netherlands
 Centraal Museum, Utrecht
 Haags Gemeentemuseum, The Hague
 Museum De Wieger, Deurne
 Rijksmuseum Kröller-Müller, Otterlo

France
 Musée d’Art Moderne de la Ville de Paris

References
 'Raoul Martinez', by Rosella Huber-Spanier, Museum De Wieger 1999, 
 'Raoul Martinez en zijn Don Quichot', article by Rosella Huber-Spanier in Jong Holland, jaargang 16 nr.1, 2000, pag. 42-50

External links
 Martinez

References 

19th-century French painters
French male painters
20th-century French painters
20th-century French male artists
1876 births
1974 deaths
19th-century French male artists